The Armed Forces of the United Arab Republic was the official designation of the Armed Forces of the United Arab Republic, a union made up of the territories of Egypt and Syria. After the union was announced on 22 February 1958, the Syrian Army was called the First Army, and the Egyptian Army was named the Second Army. It was dissolved after Syria withdrew from Unity after a coup d'état took place on 28 September 1961. However, Egypt under Nasser continued using the designation.

References

External links 
 الجيش العربي السوري في عهد الجمهورية العربية المتحدة

Military of Egypt
Military of Syria
Disbanded armed forces
Military units and formations established in 1958
Military units and formations disestablished in 1961